Jean Restout may refer to:
 Jean I Restout (1666–1702), French painter
 Jean II Restout (1692–1768), French painter
 Jean-Bernard Restout (1732–1797), French painter